There is a large population of Moroccans in Italy. According to the Italian National Institute of Statistics, the country was home to 420,650 Moroccan immigrants in 2017. The equivalent figure in 2014 was 454,773.

Geographical distribution
Based on Demo Istat statistics.

Turin 17,253 
Milan 7,861
Rome 5,210
Genoa 4,213
Bologna 3,927
Modena 2,977
Reggio Emilia 2,547

Religion 
In the years 2011 and 2012 the ISTAT made a survey regarding the religious affiliation among the immigrants in Italy, the religion of the Moroccan people in Italy were as follows:
  Muslims: 99.0%
  Christianity: 0.3%
 Non religious: 0.5%
 Other religions: 0.3%

Notable people

Mostafa Errebbah (1971), long-distance runner
Nadia Ejjafini (1977), long-distance runner
Malika Ayane (1984), singer
Joseph Lasiri (1991), Muay Thai fighter List of ONE Championship champions#ONE Strawweight Muay Thai World Champion
Adam Masina (1994), footballer
Walid Cheddira (1998), footballer 
Hachim Mastour (1998), footballer
Shady Oukhadda (1999), footballer

See also
 Arabs in Europe
 Arabs in Italy
 Egyptians in Italy
 Algerians in Italy

References

Further reading

Moroccan diaspora in Europe
Immigration to Italy
Arabs in Italy
Islam in Italy
Muslim communities in Europe